Carex agglomerata is a species of plant in the family Cyperaceae first described by Charles Baron Clarke.

Subspecies
List of subspecies in Catalogue of Life:
 Carex agglomerata rhizomata
 Carex agglomerata agglomerata

References

agglomerata